John Randolph Tucker (August 13, 1854 – December 18, 1926) was an American judge and Democratic politician who served as a member of the Virginia Senate.

He was born in Philadelphia to Dr. David Hunter Tucker and the former Elizabeth Dallas. His father, son of Henry St. George Tucker, Sr., was then serving as Dean of the Medical College of Virginia.

He was sometimes referred to as "J. Randolph Tucker, Jr.," to distinguish him from his uncle, a U.S. congressman.

In 1913, Tucker was appointed by Woodrow Wilson to a four-year term on the federal bench in the Alaska territory. While there, Judge Tucker named the Wade Hampton Census Area in Alaska to commemorate his father-in-law, South Carolina politician Wade Hampton III. In 2015, after new attention was brought to Hampton's status as a Confederate general and ardent supporter of the Ku Klux Klan, the area was re-designated as the Kusilvak Census Area.

References

External links

1854 births
1926 deaths
Alaska Territory judges
20th-century American judges
People from Buena Vista, Virginia
Democratic Party Virginia state senators
20th-century American politicians
Politicians from Philadelphia
J. Randolph